Glinnik  is a village in the administrative district of Gmina Abramów, within Lubartów County, Lublin Voivodeship, in eastern Poland.

In 2005 the village had a population of 459.

Notable people
Stanisław Koziej (born 1943), Polish brigadier general.

References

Villages in Lubartów County